F. Douglas Gibson (18 November 1929 – 3 November 1993) was Canadian freestyle swimmer. He competed in three events at the 1948 Summer Olympics.

References

External links
 

1929 births
1993 deaths
Canadian male freestyle swimmers
Olympic swimmers of Canada
Swimmers from Toronto
Swimmers at the 1948 Summer Olympics